Partido Demokratiko Pilipino–Lakas ng Bayan, abbreviated as PDP–Laban, is a social democratic political party in the Philippines founded in 1982. It was part of the country's ruling party coalition from 1986 to 1992 under the administration of Corazon Aquino and the country's ruling party from 2016 to 2022 under the administration of Rodrigo Duterte.

History

First major era (1983–1988) 
The party now known as PDP–Laban is the result of a merger between the Partido Demokratiko Pilipino and Lakas ng Bayan.

Partido Demokratiko Pilipino (PDP)
Partido Demokratiko Pilipino (PDP) was founded on February 6, 1982, in Cebu City by Aquilino "Nene" Pimentel Jr. and a group of protesters against the authoritarian government of Ferdinand Marcos, the 10th president of the Philippines, and his ruling party, the Kilusang Bagong Lipunan (KBL). These protesters included the leaders of Cebu City, Davao City and Cagayan de Oro, such as former Cebu 2nd district congressman Antonio Cuenco as the convention's first chairman, Ribomapil Holganza, as the convention's first secretary-general, Zafiro L. Respicio, Rey Magno Teves, Cesar R. Ledesma, Samuel Occeña, Crispin Lanorias and Mords Cua.
  
Ribomapil Holganza, then the party's Secretary-General, with the support of the other Visayas delegates, proposed the name Katipunan, in honor of the historic Filipino nationalist movement. The convention, however, decided against name proposed by Holganza and decided to retain the name Pilipino Democratic Party. The delegates also created the party's official logo which included the image of Lapu-Lapu as a symbol of the party's adherence to Filipino individualism. The Lapu-Lapu image continues to be a prominent figure in PDP–Laban's logo to this day. The delegates also decided that the Filipino version Partido Demokratiko Pilipino may be used alongside the English version Pilipino Democratic Party.

PDP appealed to the non-communist Left. Political scientist Alex Magno described PDP as "more advanced… in its analysis of Philippine society and the ills that beset it" compared with the mainstream anti-Marcos groups. PDP was also unique at its time for operating "on the basis of organizational initiative rather than, merely on the basis of personal loyalty to politician-personalities"; and for requiring prospective members to attend a seminar to learn the party's ideology.

Merger into PDP–Laban and 1986 snap election
In February 1983, PDP formally merged with Lakas ng Bayan (LABAN; Tagalog for "People's Power"), the party founded by former senator Benigno Aquino Jr. in 1978. The merger was complementary, as PDP was mass-based and had its bailiwick in Visayas and Mindanao, while LABAN was composed of traditional politicians and had its bailiwick in Luzon and Metro Manila. In August 1983, Aquino was assassinated. This, along with an economic crisis, plunged Marcos' popularity and sparked protests. In the parliamentary election of 1984, PDP–Laban and the United Nationalist Democratic Organization (UNIDO) were the major opposition groups. PDP–Laban won six seats. That same year, in anticipation of a snap election, influential opposition figures convened to select a common presidential candidate. Pimentel was included in their shortlist of eleven possible standard bearers. However, UNIDO nominated Salvador Laurel as their presidential candidate. In October 1985, Chino Roces launched the Cory Aquino for President Movement (CAPM), which aimed to nominate Aquino's widow, Corazon, as the opposition's presidential candidate. PDP–Laban was a strong supporter of the movement.  In November 1985, Marcos called for a snap presidential election. Later that month, the opposition parties including PDP–Laban formed a new coalition called Laban ng Bayan. Laurel eventually gave way and became Corazon Aquino's running mate under the UNIDO-Laban ng Bayan coalition.

PDP–Laban then aligned itself with UNIDO, which became the main group and leader of the coalition that opposed Marcos. After the People Power Revolution of 1986, which saw Aquino and Laurel proclaimed president and vice president respectively, PDP–Laban continued its alliance with UNIDO until the latter's dissolution in 1987.

Laban ng Demokratikong Pilipino split
Before the 1988 local elections, some senators including Aquilino Pimentel Jr. criticized the party along with Lakas ng Bansa for their loosening policy towards accepting members of the Kilusang Bagong Lipunan (KBL), a party which is largely composed of Marcos loyalists and sympathizers. In 1988, PDP–Laban was split into two factions: the Pimentel Wing led by Pimentel and the Cojuangco Wing led by Jose Cojuangco Jr. The Cojuangco Wing and the Lakas ng Bansa party of House Speaker Ramon Mitra, Jr. merged in 1988 to form the Laban ng Demokratikong Pilipino party.

After the merger, the prominence of PDP–Laban greatly fell, and the party was not a major party until the 2016 presidential election with the campaign of eventual winner Rodrigo Duterte.

1988–2016
In the Senate, Aquilino Pimentel Jr. had been the person most associated with the party, with him serving multiple terms in the Senate. After he retired, his son Koko Pimentel won an electoral protest to enter the Senate in 2011.

PDP–Laban has become associated with the Binay dynasty of Makati, with Jejomar Binay as its mayor and his allies holding the two districts of Makati in the House of Representatives. Other strongholds of the party include Davao City, where Rodrigo Duterte won multiple terms as mayor.

On July 1, 2015, as part of his bid for the 2016 presidential election, then-Vice President Binay resigned as party chairman and formed the United Nationalist Alliance (UNA). Since then, Senator Aquilino "Koko" Pimentel III headed the party as its national president.

Second major era (2016–2021) 
The party is currently re-grouping, and there are some movements of expansion especially in Mindanao, where it originated, particularly in the Davao region. Two of the party's founders, Crispin Lanorias and Cesar Ledesma, are again active in recent party activities. After the 2016 elections, PDP–Laban signed a coalition agreement with the Nacionalista Party, Lakas–CMD, National Unity Party and the Nationalist People's Coalition, witnessed by then president-elect Rodrigo Duterte.

Immediately after the May 2016 elections, several representatives from other parties moved to PDP–Laban, notably: Geraldine Roman (Bataan), Alfred Vargas (Quezon City), and Ansaruddin Adiong (Lanao del Sur). The party's presence in the House of Representatives eventually grew from three members in the 16th Congress, to 123 members in the current 17th Congress. By April 2018, 300,000 politicians had joined the party, according to Koko Pimentel.

Reacting to the influx of new members, party founder Nene Pimentel urged members to question the motivations of new incoming politicians and ensure they are interested in the party's ideals. He stated that these new members might only be interested in identifying with the current administration, in order to boost their chances of winning in the upcoming 2019 elections.

PDP–Laban plans to learn from the Chinese Communist Party (CCP). It is set to send some of its members to the CCP's school in Fujian for "policy training" to learn more on how the party is organized. The Filipino party also established ties with United Russia, Russia's ruling party, in October 2017. PDP–Laban has also expressed interest in sending a delegation to the Workers' Party of Korea, which is the ruling party of North Korea. A four-member delegation is set to meet with the North Korean party in July 2018.

2018 leadership crisis 
On July 23, 2018, the same day as Duterte's third State of the Nation Address, an internal leadership dispute within the House of Representatives' majority resulted in former president and current Pampanga representative Gloria Macapagal-Arroyo becoming Speaker of the lower house, replacing Pantaleon Alvarez. The resolution was adopted that same night with 184 voting in favor and 12 abstaining. Arroyo was previously a member of Lakas–CMD, before switching to PDP–Laban in 2017.

Some representatives, including Deputy Speaker Rolando Andaya (Camarines Sur), had been eyeing to shift towards other political parties after Arroyo's ascendance to the House's leadership. Andaya also had said that some lawmakers might join Lakas–CMD, Arroyo's former party, and merge with Sara Duterte-Carpio's Hugpong ng Pagbabago (HNP). Duterte-Carpio denied rumors that members of PDP–Laban were seeking to move into HNP, which is a regional party based in Davao Region.

Succeeding these events, a faction sought to unseat PDP–Laban's high-ranking officials. Willy Talag, president of the party's Makati city council and chair of the membership committee of the NCR Chapter, said during an assembly of the party on July 27 that PDP–Laban's current leaders have committed violations, including holding mass oath-taking of members “without proper basic seminar” and swearing-in officials that are “involved in illegal drugs." The faction elected Rogelio Garcia and Talag as party president and chairman, respectively, removing Senator Aquilino "Koko" Pimentel III and Rep. Pantaleon Alvarez from their respective positions.

Koko Pimentel dismissed the election of new leaders, disowning the group and assembly, and called the event an "unofficial, unauthorized, rogue assembly using the name of PDP–Laban". Sen. Pimentel, who has personally dismissed the election, together with PDP–Laban vice chairman and Department of Energy Sec. Alfonso Cusi, and Rep. Alvarez have notified members that the supposed national assembly was not officially sanctioned by the party. Special Assistant to the President Bong Go said in an interview with CNN Philippines that Duterte is set to meet the two factions, in an effort to unite the party.

2019 general election
Months later, on November 30, the Commission on Elections (COMELEC) released a statement recognizing Pimentel's group as the legitimate leadership of PDP–Laban. Following this, Pimentel has said that his faction will not recognize candidates from the Garcia wing.

The party secured three new seats in the Senate after winning the 2019 general election, with Bato dela Rosa, Francis Tolentino, and Bong Go joining the upper house, increasing the number of PDP–Laban senators to five. Meanwhile, the party kept its majority in the House of Representatives, forming a coalition with the Nacionalista Party, Nationalist People's Coalition, Lakas–CMD, some members of the Liberal Party, and several party-lists.

In 2020, amidst the COVID-19 pandemic, Manny Pacquiao was installed as party president, replacing Pimentel.

2021 party faction dispute and 2022 election

Manny Pacquiao was elected to the position of PDP–Laban president in December 2020 under an acting capacity. An internal rift in within the party started in early 2021, when Pacquiao criticized Philippine President Rodrigo Duterte's policy regarding the South China Sea dispute, finding Duterte's response against China's assertions of its claim in the area as lacking. Duterte, also the PDP–Laban chairman, rebuked Pacquiao's criticisms and took offense to a statement attributed to Pacquiao that his administration was more corrupt than his predecessors. Pacquiao also came into conflict with PDP–Laban vice chairman Alfonso Cusi.

On July 17, 2021, amidst the split between Pacquiao and Cusi, Alfonso Cusi was elected as the party's president in a meeting attended by President Duterte.

On September 9, 2021, the Cusi-led faction of PDP–Laban would nominate Duterte as their vice presidential nominee for the 2022 election but without a standard bearer for the presidency. However, during the filing of candidacies, Duterte backed down from running as vice president. On September 19, 2021, the Pacquiao-led faction of PDP–Laban formally nominated Pacquiao as their presidential candidate for 2022. During the filing of the candidacy, Pacquiao announced that Lito Atienza will be his running mate.

On October 8, 2021, senators Bato dela Rosa and Bong Go filed their candidacy for president and vice president, respectively, as standard bearers for the Duterte-Cusi faction. On November 13, 2021, dela Rosa withdrew his candidacy with Go taking his place as the faction's presidential nominee. One month after, Go also withdrew his candidacy, leaving the Duterte-Cusi faction without a nominee in the 2022 election.

On January 21, 2022, the Duterte-Cusi faction announced Sara Duterte as their adopted candidate for vice president; the Cusi wing later supported her running mate, Bongbong Marcos, a son of a former President Ferdinand Marcos, on March 22, 2022. The endorsement of Marcos by the Cusi wing is criticized by both Pimentel and the original members of the party as PDP–Laban was established to oppose the Marcos dictatorship.

The Pimentel-Pacquiao faction meanwhile maintained that Pacquiao and Atienza are the "genuine" standard bearers of PDP–Laban.

On May 5, 2022, PDP–Laban has been declared by the Commission on Elections as the "dominant majority party" for the 2022 elections. The Comelec en banc made the decision despite the pending leadership dispute within the ruling party.

The party's two factions have both applied for accreditation as the dominant majority party, thus, PDP–Laban “shall be treated as one single political party for purposes of determining the dominant majority party," as stated in the COMELEC's Resolution No. 10787 which was promulgated on May 4. In the same issuance, COMELEC also declared the Nacionalista Party (NP) as the "dominant minority party." As the dominant majority, PDP–Laban will be entitled to 5th copy of the election returns and 7th copy of the certificates of canvass, as well as getting preference in the deployment of election watchers.

On May 6, 2022, days before the 2022 elections, the COMELEC recognized the Duterte-Cusi faction as the legitimate and official PDP–Laban.

Ideology and platform
PDP–Laban is a "centre-left" or "left-wing" party generally described as a democratic socialist, social-democratic, and populist party. They also have federalist tendencies. The party advocates a transition to a federal, presidential form of government from the current unitary presidential system through a revision of the present 1987 Constitution of the Philippines. According to self-published materials, the party seeks a peaceful and democratic way of life characterized by "freedom, solidarity, justice, equity, social responsibility, self-reliance, efficiency and enlightened nationalism". It has touted as its five guiding principles the following: theism, authentic humanism, enlightened nationalism, democratic socialism, and consultative and participatory democracy. The context of its espoused ideology has been in dispute, however, due to the party's recent pro-China, pro-Russia and North Korea-friendly stance since Duterte's rise in the party.

Symbols 

From the 1980s, the 'Laban' or 'L' sign was a hand gesture used by the party, along with other members of the UNIDO coalition, which originally supported Corazon Aquino. This was done by raising the thumb and index finger over the forehead, forming a letter "L' shape. This was popularized during the People Power Revolution. During the campaign and presidency of Rodrigo Duterte, the Laban sign fell into disuse within PDP–Laban and was replaced with a clenched fist, a gesture popularized by Duterte. The clenched fist was later included in the party's current logo.

Current party officials

Chairman: Former Philippine President Rodrigo Duterte 
Vice Chairman: Former Energy Secretary Alfonso Cusi 
President: Palawan Second District Representative Jose Alvarez
Executive Vice President: Senator Robin Padilla
Vice President for NCR: Parañaque First District Representative Edwin Olivarez
Vice President for Luzon: Senator Francis Tolentino
Vice President for Visayas: Cebu City Mayor Mike Rama
Vice President for Mindanao: Senator Ronald dela Rosa
Secretary-General: Atty. Melvin Matibag
Treasurer: Pampanga Third District Representative Aurelio Gonzales Jr.
Auditor: Senator Bong Go

Candidates for Philippine general elections

2016

Presidential ticket 
 Rodrigo Duterte for president (formally announced candidacy on November 21, 2015 and officially filed Certificate of Candidacy on November 27 and December 8) – WON
Martin Diño (filed his candidacy on October 16, 2015, withdrawn on October 29)
 Alan Peter Cayetano for vice president

2019

Senatorial candidates 
Ronald "Bato" Dela Rosa  – WON
Bong Go – WON
Dong Mangudadatu
Aquilino "Koko" Pimentel III – WON
Francis Tolentino – WON

2022 
The party under Cusi wing endorsed and supported the candidacies of Bongbong Marcos for president and Sara Duterte for vice president. Senator Ronald dela Rosa filed the candidacy as the party’s official candidate for the presidential race but later withdrawn.

Senatorial candidates

Cusi faction 
Robin Padilla – WON
Salvador "Sal Panalo" Panelo
Rodante Marcoleta 
Rey Langit
Astra Pimentel 
Bro John Castriciones 
Greco Belgica

Pacquiao faction 
Lutgardo "Lutz" Barbo

Electoral performance

Presidential elections

Vice presidential elections

Legislative elections

Senate

House of Representatives

Notes

References

Bibliography

External links

1982 establishments in the Philippines
Centre-left parties in Asia
Democratic socialist parties in Asia
Federalism in the Philippines
Federalist parties
Left-wing parties in Asia
Left-wing populism
Social democratic parties in Asia
Political parties established in 1982
Populist parties
Rodrigo Duterte
Socialist parties in the Philippines